Gil Jae or Kil Jae (1353–1419, 길재, 吉再) was a Korean scholar-official of the Goryeo period then of the Joseon period.

Works 
 Yaeun jip (야은집, 冶隱集)
 Yaeun eunhaeng seupyu (야은언행습유, 冶隱言行拾遺)
 Yaeun sokjip (야은속집, 冶隱續集)

See also 
 Jeong Mong-ju
 Jeong Do-jeon
 Kwon Geun
 Jeong Inji

External links
 Gil Jae, gumi.go.kr

1353 births
1419 deaths
Korean Confucianists
Neo-Confucian scholars
Haepyeong Gil clan
14th-century Korean poets
15th-century Korean poets
14th-century Korean philosophers
Joseon scholar-officials